With Chronos’ Permit is a thriller novel by Russian writer Andrei Gusev, published in 1995.

Plot summary

Everything began with the shooting of the film. The famous producer of Soviet and Russian cinema made production of some episodes in Kaluga area of Russia. Then shooting of the film will continue in Berlin. In the evening, in a hotel room the producer reread the script. The story was the next.

Because of Perestroika, physicist Ivan Zhuravlev is unemployed, and must take a job in journalism instead. This puts him in contact with the head of the Chronos corporation – Boris Iossifovich Sytin (Zhuravlev calls him Ossi), who persuades him to participate in the illicit sale of osmium to the West. This affair ends tragically for Ivan Zhuravlev – he dies because of the intentional air crash.
Love to the girl was the best in the short life of Ivan Zhuravlev. Her name is Nastia. In their relationship something is from the famous movies by Claude Lelouch, who always glorifies man and woman created for each other.

At the end of film script an epilogue was, in which producer read about his participation in this film. Producer astonished very much: at an earlier time, these pages were not in the script!

Literary features 
With Chronos’ Permit is a novel with a non-linear storyline. The novel takes place in the time period of the early 1990s. This novel is a mix of a thriller and crime story. From another side some parts of the novel have a mystical component.

References

Other websites
Russian Wikiquote has the article   С  мандатом Хроноса (With Chronos’ Permit).

Notes
1.  
2. НА ПОРОГЕ  ХХI ВЕКА, Всероссийский ежегодник, М., "Московский Парнас", 2002 (с.92) 
3. Всероссийский ежегодник НА ПОРОГЕ  ХХI ВЕКА, М., "Московский Парнас", 2006 (с.85)
4. И.С.Горюнова  "Современная русская литература: знаковые имена (статьи, рецензии, интервью)",  "Litres", 2015. – 278 c. (М., "Вест-Консалтинг", 2012) , 

Novels set in Moscow
1995 Russian novels
Political thriller novels
Novels about terrorism
Nonlinear narrative novels